Admiral Ramón Auńón y Villalón (25 August 1844, Morón de la Frontera – 20 May 1925, Madrid) was a Spanish naval officer who served as the Minister of the Navy during the Spanish–American War, replacing Segismundo Bermejo y Merelo. He had joined the Armada at the age of 15 and fought in conflicts in Africa and Cuba, later commanding a battleship and gaining a reputation for being an efficient administrator. Upon becoming Minister of the navy, Auńon was forced to make a decision of whether or not Admiral Pascual Cervera y Topete's squadron in Santiago de Cuba should sortie or not. He ultimately decided in favor, resulting in the Battle of Santiago de Cuba. Afterwards, he would serve as a member of the Congress of Deputies and as civil governor of the Province of Barcelona.

Sources

References

Books
 

1844 births
1925 deaths
Government ministers of Spain
Members of the Congress of Deputies of the Spanish Restoration
Spanish admirals
Spanish military personnel of the Spanish–American War
Civil governors of Barcelona